Nicolaus is a census-designated place (CDP) in Sutter County, California. Nicolaus is part of the Yuba City Metropolitan Statistical Area. The 2010 United States census reported Nicolaus's population was 211.

It is named after Nicolaus Allgeier, local rancher. The town's former names included Nicolaus Ferry and Nicolaus' Ranche.

History
Nicolaus Allgeier established a ferry at what later became the town of Nicolaus in 1843 to cross the Feather River on the road between Sutter's Fort and Sutter's Hock Farm.  The town was established in 1850 and has had a post office since July 28, 1851 making it one of the oldest post offices in the state.

Nicolaus was an early major stopping point on the Feather River during the California Gold Rush. It was the county seat of Sutter County in 1850-1851 and again 1852-1856 except for two months in 1854 when it was located in Yuba City.  The area was described by R.T.P. ,Allen, Special Agent of the United States Government for the purpose of selecting early post offices in California as "a most beautiful country...[t]he country bordering the Feather River (near Nicolaus) is by far the most fertile and most beautiful I have seen in California."

Nicolaus was once home to a significant Chinese American community, but it violently drove all its Chinese American residents out of town in March 1886. It was also home to a large mixed population of Maidu Indians and Hawaiians, or Kanakas, which has since relocated to El Dorado County, California.  The Hawaiians or Kanakas are descendants of workers brought over by John Sutter in 1839.

The town itself has approximately 200 residents and the outlying area has a population of roughly 600.  The town is located just off State Highway 99 and adjoins the Feather River.  The State Highway used to go through the town but a major flood in 1955 tore out the bridge over the Feather River and the town's commercial district has declined since that time.

The community is inside area code 530. The zip code is 95659 that also encompasses the communities of East Nicolaus, Trowbridge, Lee and Verona.  It is served by East Nicolaus High School that is renowned for its male and female sports teams.  The football team was the State of California Small Schools Champion in 2015 and has won several section titles in football and other sports.  It is also served by Marcum-Illinois Elementary School.

Recreational opportunities abound in the area. Golfers have access to the River Oaks Golf Course, a public 18-hole course, which is located next to the Feather River.  The area is an outdoor paradise widely known for its hunting, fishing and bird watching.  It is also known for canoeing and kayaking on the Feather River and for bicycling along its roads.

The area is unique in that it has retained its rural character yet is only 20 minutes north of Sacramento, the state capital. The economy of the Nicolaus area is driven by farming and walnut orchards and rice farming predominate.  The town of Nicolaus is the site of an annual Labor Day parade, which attracts visitors from throughout the state.

Geography
According to the United States Census Bureau, the CDP covers an area of 3.1 square miles (8.1 km), all of it land.

Climate
According to the Köppen Climate Classification system, Nicolaus has a warm-summer Mediterranean climate, abbreviated "Csa" on climate maps.

Demographics
The 2010 United States Census reported that Nicolaus had a population of 211. The racial makeup of Nicolaus was 186 (88.2%) White, 1 (0.5%) African American, 0 (0.0%) Native American, 5 (2.4%) Asian, 0 (0.0%) Pacific Islander, 10 (4.7%) from other races, and 9 (4.3%) from two or more races. Hispanic or Latino of any race were 13 persons (6.2%).

The Census reported that 207 people (98.1% of the population) lived in households, 4 (1.9%) lived in non-institutionalized group quarters, and 0 (0%) were institutionalized.

There were 92 households, out of which 22 (23.9%) had children under the age of 18 living in them, 56 (60.9%) were opposite-sex married couples living together, 7 (7.6%) had a female householder with no husband present, 4 (4.3%) had a male householder with no wife present.  There were 3 (3.3%) unmarried opposite-sex partnerships, and 1 (1.1%) same-sex married couples or partnerships. 23 households (25.0%) were made up of individuals, and 7 (7.6%) had someone living alone who was 65 years of age or older. The average household size was 2.25.  There were 67 families (72.8% of all households); the average family size was 2.63.

The population was spread out, with 35 people (16.6%) under the age of 18, 16 people (7.6%) aged 18 to 24, 32 people (15.2%) aged 25 to 44, 65 people (30.8%) aged 45 to 64, and 63 people (29.9%) who were 65 years of age or older.  The median age was 51.1 years. For every 100 females, there were 104.9 males.  For every 100 females age 18 and over, there were 97.8 males.

The homeowner vacancy rate was 0%; the rental vacancy rate was 3.4%.  145 people (68.7% of the population) lived in owner-occupied housing units and 62 people (29.4%) lived in rental housing units.

Politics
In the state legislature, Nicolaus is in the 4th Senate District, represented by Republican Jim Nielsen, and in the 3rd Assembly District, represented by Republican James Gallagher.

References

External links
 

Census-designated places in Sutter County, California
Census-designated places in California